General Greene may refer to:

Arthur Green (British Army officer) (born 1878), British Army brigadier general
Douglass T. Greene (1891–1964), U.S. Army major general
Francis Vinton Greene (1850–1921), U.S. Army general who fought in the Spanish–American War
G. B. Greene Jr. (1914–1998), U.S. Air Force major general
George S. Greene (1801–1899), Union general during the American Civil War
Harold J. Greene (1959–2014), U.S. Army major general
Henry Alexander Greene (1856–1921), U.S. Army major general
Nathanael Greene (1742–1786), Continental Army general during the American Revolutionary War
Wallace M. Greene (1907–2003), United States Marine Corps general, Commandant of the Marine Corps
 , several ships of the United States Navy
 , U.S. Coast Guard patrol boat

General Green may refer to:
Charles B. Green (born 1955), U.S. Air Force lieutenant general
Sir Charles Green, 1st Baronet (1749–1831), British Army general
Joseph A. Green (1881–1963), U.S. Army major general
Martin E. Green (1815–1863), Confederate general during the American Civil War
Percurt Green (born 1939), Swedish Army lieutenant general
Thomas Green (general) (1814–1864), Confederate general during the American Civil War
Thomas H. Green (1889–1971), U.S. Army major general
Wilfrith Green (1872–1937), British Army brigadier general
William Green (British Army officer, born 1882) (1882–1947), British Army major general
Sir William Green, 1st Baronet (1725–1811), British Army general
William Henry Rodes Green (1823–1912), British Indian Army major general
William Wyndham Green (1887–1979), British Army lieutenant general
, U.S. Revenue Cutter

See also
Attorney General Greene (disambiguation)